Dorah Ilunga is a Belgian politician of Congolese origin. She is the first black female Deputy Mayor in Belgium.

She has been honoured by King Albert II of Belgium. Magazines, radio and TV stations and other media both Belgian and foreign, covered the event.

As Deputy Mayor, Dorah was in charge of employment, education, trade, social cohesion and developmental cooperation.

She was a registrar, Civil Officiant, celebrating so many marriage ceremonies. She has been the only black female registrar and Deputy Mayor to this day.

Career 
Born in Kinshasa, Democratic Republic of the Congo, Dorah Ilunga arrived in Belgium in 1986 for study without the intention of settling there. After earning a first degree in food, then a degree in science work the ULB (Université Libre de Bruxelles), she obtained a first job in a defense association of different interests, including all matters relating to citizenship. then she has coordinated several projects for development cooperation before enter the local mission of the Brussels municipality of Saint-Josse where she led a project for the integration of foreign-born minorities and another project of social cohesion. Having realized that the big decisions to work in social action, broadly defined, were political, she decided to move to the other side of the bar to be more effective. thing led to another, she found herself in the office of the Federal Minister for Employment the time, Mrs Onkelinx.

Dorah handled everything that was related to youth employment, training and other support for the unemployed plans. Meanwhile, after the municipal elections of 2000, she was appointed Advisor to CPAS (Public Centre for Social Welfare) of the municipality of Saint-Josse where she served on the commission for granting the subsistence (minimum wage). Then came the municipal council before Alderman in 2003: Alderwoman first black woman in Belgium, a position she held until 2006. "It was not always obvious" is she recalls. "At the beginning, relationships are often based on fears and everyone inside wonder how to behave. Nevertheless, little by little, things settle. In short, I behaved in pioneering and so I had to fight. My situation was much more difficult than my mistakes have tarnished the image of the entire community that I come from. "

Recently, it has opened an office tips and strategies on gender, "Dorah ILUNGA and Associates – DI & A" (non-profit organization – nonprofit), specializing in communication and in the ICT (Information Technology and Communication) in the service of Women in Business. This is a concrete action that combines the power of new information technologies with networking and support to business excellence created, managed or run by women.

Positions held 
 Former Deputy Mayor of Saint-Josse-ten-Noode – Brussels
 Town Councillor of Saint-Josse-ten-Noode – Brussels
 Former Member of the Board Council of the CPAS of Saint-Josse-ten-Noode – Brussels
 Former President of the Employment Centre of Saint-Josse-ten-Noode
 Former Member of the board of the Public Water company  (VIVAQUA) 
 Actually member of the public Electricity company (SIBELGA) and the public laboratories (BRULABO)

Controversy
On December 26, 2016 a 6 year old boy was hospitalized after standing for hours in the cold on a balcony as punishment by his stepfather. The apartment where the events occurred appeared to be the official address of Dorah Ilunga. She also is the mother of the man who put the child in the cold.
This case raised questions about the official home address of Mrs Ilunga. As she is supposed to be living with her mother in a social housing in the municipality, there's a strong indication she has given a false address and committed address fraud.

References

http://archives.lesoir.be/saint-josse-la-premiere-echevine-subsaharienne-de-bruxe_t-20031105-Z0NQ6E.html

External links

https://www.youtube.com/watch?v=djetjlicKws
http://archives.lesoir.be/saint-josse-la-premiere-echevine-subsaharienne-de-bruxe_t-20031105-Z0NQ6E.html

Living people
Belgian politicians
Year of birth missing (living people)